Milk candy may refer to:

Dulce de leche, caramelized milk or milk jam
Milk candy (Asia), a hard candy common to Japan, China and Korea, such as White Rabbit